Wajahh: A Reason to Kill is a 2004 bollywood Indian Hindi-language thriller film directed by Gautam Adhikari, written by Ghalib Asadbhopali (dialogue), Tony Mirrcandani (story), and screenlayed by Sandeep Patel. The film features Arbaaz Khan, Gracy Singh, Shamita Shetty, Zulfi Syed, and Sudesh Berry in lead role. It is co-produced by Markand Adhikari and Anand Pandit, music and lyrics by Anand Raj Anand. The film is composed by Daler Mehandi.

Cast 
Arbaaz Khan as Dr. Aditya Bhargava
Gracy Singh as Trishna Bhargava, Dr. Aditya's wife
Shamita Shetty as Ishita Singhania, Dr. Aditya's love interest
Zulfi Syed as Raj 
Sudesh Berry as Sameer
Satish Kaushik as Inspector Bholenath
Vijayendra Ghatge as Singhania, Ishita's father
Zahid Ali	as Villain MIKE	
Aarti Nagpal as Sonia 
Firdaus Mevawala as Doctor Taneja

Soundtrack

References

External links

Wajjah: A reason to kill at Bollywood Hungama

2000s Hindi-language films
Indian erotic thriller films
Films shot in Mumbai
2000s erotic thriller films
2004 films